Kathroperla is a genus of green stoneflies in the family Chloroperlidae. There are at least four described species in Kathroperla.

Species
These four species belong to the genus Kathroperla:
 Kathroperla doma Stark, 2010
 Kathroperla perdita Banks, 1920 (longhead sallfly)
 Kathroperla siskiyou Stark & Kondratieff, 2015
 Kathroperla takhoma Stark & Surdick, 1987 (slenderhead sallfly)

References

Further reading

 
 

Chloroperlidae
Articles created by Qbugbot